General Aziz Al-Yasiri was the Secretary General of the Iraqi Democratic Current.

Early life and career
He was born on July 1, 1945, in Hilla, Babylon Province, Iraq, into the Al-Yasiri tribe. He began his career as a member of the Baath party in 1958, enlisting in the party at the age of 13. After his graduation from the Iraqi Military College in 1966, he moved on to become head of the Baath Party Military Office for the Central Euphrates Region. During this time, he undertook various missions to Berlin and Moscow.

In exile
In August 1980, a year after Saddam Hussein took over the Presidency of Iraq, General Aziz Al-Yasiri left for Vienna, Austria, where he lived until American coalition forces invaded Iraq and toppled Saddam's regime in 2003. During his exile years, he made contacts with various anti-Saddam governments, including the British Foreign Office and the U.S. State Department. He participated in various conferences that prompted the toppling of Saddam Hussein's regime and the establishment of a democratic Iraq.

Return to Iraq
In 2003, he founded the Democratic Iraqi Current party. With sectarian differences running high in Iraq and a closed system list which guaranteed large religious and sectarian parties a large number of seats, secular parties such as the Democratic Iraqi Current did not fare well in the Iraqi legislative election of 2005. Receiving only 8331 votes, or.10%.   After his party's defeat, he went on to participate in changing the Iraqi voting system from a single, country-wide list to an open list, guaranteeing minorities proportionate seats roughly equal to their population numbers, regardless of voter turnout.

Death

Increasingly dissatisfied with the system, he tried to organize a vote of no-confidence against the government of Prime Minister Nouri al-Maliki after labelling his government as a “multi-party dictatorship.” On June 25, 2007, a suicide bomber blew himself up in the Baghdad Mansour Hotel lobby, killing General Aziz Al-Yasiri and former Anbar Governor Fassal Al-Guood, as well as prominent tribal sheiks from Anbar Province. These tribal sheiks, associated with the Anbar Salvation Council, had taken up arms against Al-Qaeda Iraq. General Aziz Al-Yasiri was taken to Ibn Sina Hospital in Baghdad's Green Zone, where he was pronounced dead on arrival. Coalition Provisional Authority doctors gave the cause of death as two gunshots to the chest.

References

 Iraq Bomb Kills U.S.-Allied Sheiks, "CBS News", 25 June 2007
 Top Shiite Cleric Hints at Wider Voting Role for Sunnis , "The New York Times", 28 June 2005

1945 births
2007 deaths
Iraqi politicians